Ron Wilson (1 October 1926 – 17 December 2010) was a professional magician, and winner of the Academy of Magical Arts Magician of the Year award in 1971.

Biography 

Ron Wilson was born in Dundee, Scotland in October, 1926. He reported he was attracted to magic by watching Dante the Magician perform in Dundee, and had his first show as a child magician at age nine in an hotel in Ireland. At age 19, he joined a traveling troupe of magicians known as the Dundee Magic Circle, which performed mostly in British small towns.

In 1952, he decided there were better chances of success for his career as a magician in North America, and moved to Windsor, Ontario. He performed there for some years, until he moved to the Magic Castle in Los Angeles, California, where he finally achieved success and international fame. He performed there for several decades, as well as aboard cruise ships, and in world tours that took him to several countries, including China and Russia. Wilson also appeared in several TV shows. He died in Los Angeles on December 17, 2010.

Bibliography 
 The Uncanny Scot: Ron Wilson by Richard Kaufman (1987)
 Tales From The Uncanny Scot by Ron Wilson and Steve Mitchell (2010)

References

External links
 The Linking Ring, Vol. 36, No. 6, August 1956, Ron Wilson by Paul Desjardins, page 55 
 Genii Magazine, Vol. 36, No. 7, July 1972, OUR COVER, Ron Wilson "The Uncanny Scot" by WWL (Jr.), page 311 
 Genii Magazine, Vol. 74, No. 2, February 2011, In Memoriam, RON WILSON 1 October 1926 – 17 December 2010, by Paul Wilson page 15 
 The Linking Ring, Vol. 91, No. 2, February 2011, Broken Wands, Ronald M. Wilson, page 114

Scottish magicians
Scottish emigrants to the United States
1926 births
2010 deaths
People from Dundee
Academy of Magical Arts Close-Up Magician of the Year winners
Academy of Magical Arts Lifetime Achievement Fellowship winners
Academy of Magical Arts Magician of the Year winners